Petra Roth (born 9 May 1944 in Bremen) is a German politician of the Christian Democratic Union (CDU). She was the Mayor of Frankfurt from 1995 to 2012. In addition she twice served as president of the Deutscher Städtetag, resuming her previous post there in 2009. The group is the head organization and lobby group for all German cities vis-à-vis the Cabinet of Germany, the German Bundestag, the Bundesrat of Germany, the European Union (EU) and many organizations.

Life 
Petra Roth is descended from a Bremen-based family of merchants. After she left the Kippenberg-Gymnasium, which has a special concentration in music, with a General Certificate of Secondary Education, she completed an apprenticeship as a medical secretary. Later she passed her exam at an upper business school. Love led her from Bremen to Frankfurt am Main. She is described as interested in the arts. She has two sons and has been widowed since 1994.

Political career

Early beginnings
Petra Roth joined the Christian Democratic Union in 1972 after she had moved to Frankfurt. Later she was elected to the local city council and between 1987 and 1995, to the Landtag of Hesse. Between 1992 and 1995 she was chair of the CDU in Frankfurt.

Mayor of Frankfurt, 1995−2012
On 25 June 1995, Roth was elected mayor of Frankfurt, defeating the incumbent Andreas von Schoeler and becoming the city's first directly elected woman mayor.

In 2001, she won the second round in a tight race against Achim Vandreike (SPD). Meanwhile, Roth is longest-serving Frankfurt mayor since World War II.

On 28 January 2007, Roth was re-elected in the first round with 60.5% of the votes but with voter participation of only 33.6%. Her rival candidate Franz Frey (SPD) got 27.5% of the votes.

Roth was briefly considered as a potential successor to Federal President Johannes Rau. In March 2008 she was considered a potential candidate for Minister-President of the State of Hesse.

From 1997 to 1999 and from 2003 to 2005, Roth served as president of Deutscher Städtetag, a position she took up again in 2009. She was also member of the Committee of the Regions of European Union.

During her time in office, Roth was a member of the board of Frankfurt International Airport Fraport, chairman of the supervisory boards of the Frankfurt trade fair Messe Frankfurt, of the municipal utility company Stadtwerke Frankfurt am Main, of the regional transport services company Rhein-Main-Verkehrsverbund, and the regional housing society ABG Frankfurt Holding.

Political positions
Within the CDU, Roth is considered a proponent of religious tolerance and a moderate stance regarding topics such as building of mosques in Germany, migration and integration, as well as drug treatment policy.

Ahead of the Christian Democrats’ leadership election in 2018, Roth publicly endorsed Friedrich Merz to succeed Angela Merkel as the party’s chair.

Other activities

Corporate boards
 AXA Konzern AG, Member of the Supervisory Board (since 2012)
 Deutsche Vermögensberatung (DVAG), Member of the Advisory Board
 Thüga, Member of the Supervisory Board
 Helaba, Ex-Officio Member of the Supervisory Board (-2012)

Non-profits
 Commerzbank Foundation, Member of the Board of Trustees
 Hertie-Stiftung, Member of the Board of Trustees (since 2012)
 Jewish Museum Frankfurt, Member of the Board of Trustees
 Max Planck Institute for European Legal History, Member of the Board of Trustees (since 2011)
 Senckenberg Nature Research Society, Member of the Board of Trustees
 Schirn Kunsthalle Frankfurt, Member of the Board of Trustees
 BHF Bank Foundation, Member of the Board of Trustees

Recognition

Honorary degrees
 2005 – Honorary doctorate from Tel Aviv University
 2010 – Honorary doctorate from the Sookmyung Women's University

Awards
 2001 – Légion d'honneur
 2012 – Julius Campe Prize
 2012 – Konrad Adenauer Prize
 2015 – Order of Merit of the Federal Republic of Germany
 2016 – Honorary citizenship of Tel Aviv
 2016 – Alfred Dregger Medal
 2017 – Honorary citizenship of Frankfurt

References

External links

Personal website 

1944 births
Christian Democratic Union of Germany politicians
Living people
Mayors of Frankfurt
Women mayors of places in Germany
Officiers of the Légion d'honneur
Officers Crosses of the Order of Merit of the Federal Republic of Germany
20th-century German women politicians
21st-century German women politicians
20th-century German politicians
21st-century German politicians